Alejandra Montes Luna (born December 25, 1989) is a Mexican luchadora professional wrestler, best known by the ring name Big Mami. She currently signed to Lucha Libre AAA Worldwide (AAA). She is a former AAA World Mixed Tag Team Champion with Niño Hamburguesa.

Professional wrestling career

Independent circuit (2006–2016)
Luna made her debut on the independent circuit under the name Big Mama, teaming with Super Nina, they defeated Cat Killer & El Rebelde. With the passage of time, Mamo fought in other independent promotions such as Reyes del Ring, International Wrestling League, Universal Wrestling Entertainment, among others.

On February 15, 2013, Mama had a match in Fusion Ichiban Silver Astro Benefit Show for the Fusion Ichiban Kawai Women's Championship, which was won by Ludark Shaitan. In mid-2015, Mama won her first championship in her career, after defeating India Mazahua and Lady Maravilla crowning herself as HUMO Women's Champion. On July 26 in the function of Promotions HUMO Female Stars, Mama lost her title to her rival Lady Maravilla.

Lucha Libre AAA Worldwide (2016–present)
In mid-2016, Mami began appearing in the largest company in Mexico, Lucha Libre AAA Worldwide (AAA) for some events, with her new ring name as Big Mami. On October 2, 2016 at Héroes Inmortales X, Mami competed for the Copa Antonio Peña being the first women's to participate in this match, along with Lady Shani and in the end was won by Pimpinela Escarlata. On March 19, 2017 in Rey de Reyes, Mami competed for the opportunity for the AAA Reina de Reinas Championship, was defeated Ayako Hamada. On June 19 in Nuevo Laredo, Mami competed with Niño Hamburguesa for the AAA World Mixed Tag Team Championship defeating Venum and Lady Shani to win the title. On May 31, 2018, in Pachuca, Mami along with Niño Hamburguesa had their first defense defeating Villano III Jr. & La Hiedra. Their second defense took place on August 25 in Triplemanía XXVI who defeated Dinastia & Lady Maravilla, El Hijo del Vikingo & Vanilla Vargas and Angelikal & La Hiedra. Their third defense took place on March 16 in Rey de Reyes who defeated Maravilla and Villano III Jr., where the feud between Maravilla and Mami began. On August 3, 2019 in Triplemanía XXVII, Hamburguesa and Mami lost their titles to Maravilla and Villano, where it was a four-way tag team match, which also included the teams of Australian Suicide & Vanilla and Sammy Guevara & Scarlett Bordeaux in their fourth defense, ending their 775-day reign, being the second longest reign of the championship.

Championships and accomplishments
Lucha Libre AAA Worldwide
AAA World Mixed Tag Team Championship (1 time) – with Niño Hamburguesa
Promociones HUMO
HUMO Women's Championship (1 time)

Luchas de Apuestas record

References

1989 births
Living people
21st-century professional wrestlers
Mexican female professional wrestlers
Professional wrestlers from Mexico City
AAA World Mixed Tag Team Champions